The Novel of the Future is a non-fiction book by Anaïs Nin, published in 1968. In it she explores the nature of the creative process in relation to novel-writing, including concepts such as defamiliarization.

References

External links
 The Novel of the Future at the Internet Archive

1968 non-fiction books
Books about writing
Books by Anaïs Nin
Macmillan Publishers books